Mirbelia densiflora is a species of flowering plant in the family Fabaceae and is endemic to the south-west of Western Australia. It was first formally described in 1942 by Charles Gardner in the Journal of the Royal Society of Western Australia. The specific epithet (densiflora) means "crowded-flowers". This mirbelia grows on ridges and plains in the Coolgardie and Mallee bioregions of south-western Western Australia, and is listed as "Priority Three" by the Government of Western Australia Department of Biodiversity, Conservation and Attractions, meaning that it is poorly known and known from only a few locations but is not under imminent threat.

References

Mirbelioids
densiflora
Fabales of Australia
Flora of Western Australia
Plants described in 1943
Taxa named by Charles Gardner